Rawlings is an English-language surname. Notable people with the name include:

Angela Rawlings, Canadian author and poet (also known as "a.rawlings")
David Rawlings, American guitar player
Donnell Rawlings, American actor and comedian
Edmund Charles Rawlings, English politician
Edwin W. Rawlings, U.S. Air Force general
George C. Rawlings, American politician
Hunter R. Rawlings III, American classics scholar
Ian Rawlings, Australian actor - in cast of Neighbours
Jade Rawlings, Australian rules footballer
Jerry Rawlings, Ghanaian politician and military leader
John Joseph Rawlings, British engineer and inventor
Johnny Rawlings, American baseball player
Nana Konadu Agyeman Rawlings, Former First Lady of Ghana
Marjorie Kinnan Rawlings, American author of short-stories and novels
Menna Rawlings, British diplomat
Moses Rawlings, colonel in the American Revolution who fought for the American army
Richard Rawlings, star of American television show Fast N' Loud, owner of Gas Monkey garage, Gas Monkey Bar N' Grill and Gas Monkey Live
Ross Rawlings, American pianist, composer, conductor, and music director
Steven Rawlings, British astrophysicist; one of the lead scientists in the Square Kilometre Array project
William Reginald Rawlings, Aboriginal Australian who received the Military Medal during World War 1

See also
Rawling, surname

References

English-language surnames
Surnames of English origin